Sheila Kay West (born September 15, 1946) is an American ophthalmologist who is the El-Maghraby Professor of Preventive Ophthalmology at the Wilmer Eye Institute. She is also the vice-chair for Research.

Early life and education 
West was born in Salt Lake City. She started her academic career at the University of California, Santa Barbara, then moved to the California State University, East Bay for graduate studies, before joining the UCSF Medical Center. She worked toward her first doctorate in pharmacy at the University of California, San Francisco, then moved to the Johns Hopkins University for her second doctorate, where she majored in epidemiology and studied congenital heart defects.

Research and career 
After her PhD she was appointed program director of pharmaceutical studies. After four years teaching medicine in the University of the Philippines, West returned to the United States.
West joined the Johns Hopkins Bloomberg School of Public Health – Wilmer Eye Institute Dana Center for Preventive Ophthalmology. She developed a surveillance system to monitor disparities in eye health, vision loss and access to ophthalmology. She became interested in cataract, the leading cause of vision impairment. She was the first to report the relationship between nuclear cataracts and smoking. Her research informed the Surgeon General of the United States's report on smoking and eye disease. In 2001, she was the first woman to be made President of the Association for Research in Vision and Ophthalmology.

West launched the Salisbury Eye Study, a longitudinal study of people on the Delmarva Peninsula. The population were racially diverse, and West identified differences in age-related macular generation between Americans of different ethnicities. This study prompted her interest in health disparities. She identified that the leading cause of blindness among Mexican Americans was glaucoma.

Alongside her work on cataracts, West was interested in the most common source of infectious eye disease, trachoma. She demonstrated that face washing is a simple and effective strategy to get rid of trachoma. Her efforts on trachoma started in Tanzania. She evaluated the success of trichiasis surgical techniques, and contributed to the World Health Organization's SAFE strategy. West has served as a mentor for several high profile scientists.

Awards and honors 
 2016 Association for Research and Vision in Ophthalmology Joanne G. Angle Award
 2017 International Blindness Prevention Award
 2018 Al Sumait Prize for Health 
 2019 Fight for Sight Weisenfeld Award
 2020 Vision Excellence Award

Selected publications

References 

Living people
1946 births
People from Salt Lake City
University of California, San Francisco alumni
Johns Hopkins University alumni
California State University, East Bay alumni
University of California, Santa Barbara alumni
American ophthalmologists
Johns Hopkins School of Medicine faculty
American women scientists